Ellin Berlin (née Mackay, 22 March 1903 – 29 July 1988) was an American author. She was the wife of Irving Berlin and the daughter of Clarence Mackay and Katherine Duer Mackay. She met Irving Berlin in 1924, and her father opposed marriage from the start. However, Irving wooed her with letters and song over the airwaves such as  "Remember" and "All Alone". They eloped and were married in a simple civil ceremony at the Municipal Building away from media attention. Because Irving was Jewish and Ellin was an Irish Catholic, their life was followed in every possible detail by the press, which found the romance of an immigrant from the Lower East Side and a young heiress a good story.

For nearly three years Clarence Mackay refused to speak to the Berlins, but they reconciled after the death of the Berlins' son, Irving Berlin Jr., on Christmas Day in 1928, less than one month after he was born. The Berlins ended up being married for 63 years until her death in 1988. They had four children: Mary Ellin Barrett in 1926; Irving Berlin, Jr. in 1928; Linda Louise Emmet in 1932; and Elizabeth Irving Peters in 1936.

Ellin Berlin wrote a number of articles for The New Yorker before her marriage. In 1933 she began writing short stories for the Saturday Evening Post and Ladies' Home Journal. In 1944 she published her first novel, Land I Have Chosen. This was followed by Lace Curtain (1958), Silver Platter (1957), and The Best of Families (1970).

She was a member of the United States Assay Commission.

References

1903 births
1988 deaths
American women novelists
American people of Irish descent
Catholics from New York (state)
Members of the United States Assay Commission
American women short story writers